Shin Dong-hyen (born September 23, 1989) is a South Korean male artistic gymnast and a member of the national team. He participated in two editions of the World Championships (2014 in Nanjing, China, and 2015 in Glasgow, Scotland). He also qualified for the 2016 Summer Olympics.

References

External links 
 

1989 births
Living people
South Korean male artistic gymnasts
Gymnasts from Seoul
Asian Games medalists in gymnastics
Gymnasts at the 2014 Asian Games
Gymnasts at the 2016 Summer Olympics
Olympic gymnasts of South Korea
Asian Games silver medalists for South Korea
Medalists at the 2014 Asian Games
21st-century South Korean people